Lukas Bauer may refer to:

 Lukáš Bauer (born 1977), Czech cross country skier
 Lukas Bauer (volleyball) (born 1989), German volleyball player in the Germany men's national volleyball team